Raketeros is a 2013 Filipino comedy film produced by Heaven's Best Entertainment starring some of 90's comedy icons Herbert Bautista, Dennis Padilla, Long Mejia, Andrew E., and Ogie Alcasid. The film will open in theaters on August 7, 2013, as part of Star Cinema's 20th Anniversary presentation.

Synopsis 
Raketeros shares the adventures and misadventures of a group of middle-aged male friends–-Berto (Herbert Bautista), the cable guy; Mando (Dennis Padilla), the billiards player; Mulong (Long Mejia), the driver; Julio (Ogie Alcasid), the all-around singer; and Andoy (Andrew) the ‘religious.’ The five are gathered to do a simple task of delivering an expensive gown to their rich friend’s mansion. However, a series of hilarious mishaps puts them and their task in jeopardy.

Cast 
Herbert Bautista as Berto
Dennis Padilla as Mando
Long Mejia as Mulong
Andrew E. as Andoy
Ogie Alcasid as Julio
Joey Marquez as Don Miguel
Mark Gil
Sam Pinto as Summer
Ryan Bang
Wendy Valdez as Winter
RR Enriquez as Fall
Regine Angeles as Spring
Tippy Dos Santos as Juicy
Rodjun Cruz as Raymir
Eula Caballero as Danica Mote
Karen Reyes as Lyca 
Markki Stroem as Mark
Ryan Boyce
Ya Chang
IC Mendoza
Ahwel Paz
Patricia Ismael 
Lassy
Rufa Mae Quinto
Nova Villa
Jaime Fabregas
Dimples Romana
Cynthia Patag
Jay Manalo
Efren Reyes
DJ Durano
Roi Vinzon
Cherry Pie Picache
Janice de Belen
Regine Velasquez
Roldan Aquino

References

External links
 

2013 films
Philippine comedy films
Star Cinema comedy films
2013 comedy films